Akassa is a settlement at the southernmost tip of Nigeria  in Bayelsa State where the Nun River estuary meets the Atlantic Ocean. It has a lighthouse that has stood since 1910.

The proximity of Akassa to the Atlantic  has made it a traditional trading site in Nigeria and during British colonial years it was the site of an outpost of the Royal Niger Company. Taxes imposed by the company on local peoples caused the settlement at Akassa to be attacked in 1895.

In the heart of the Niger Delta, habitation in the general region is sandwiched between salt water and the brackish water of mangrove swamps and most locals make their living from fishing or small scale trading, or by providing services to multi-national oil companies active in the area. There are few roads and no electricity. Health and educational facilities  are few and most people do not have access to clean water.

More recently, the Akassa Development  Foundation was formed in conjunction with Pro-Natura International, Statoil and BP to build local capacity.

Climate
Akassa has a tropical rainforest climate (Af) with heavy to very heavy rainfall year-round.

See also
Akassa Tribe

References

Ijaw
Populated places in Bayelsa State